Youri Aleksandrovich Egorov (28 May 1954 – 16 April 1988) was a Soviet and Monegasque classical pianist.

Early years
Born in Kazan, USSR, Youri Egorov studied music at the Kazan Conservatory from the age of 6 until age 17. One of his early teachers was Irina Dubinina, a former pupil of Yakov Zak.

At the age of 17, in 1971, Egorov took 4th Prize in Paris at the Marguerite Long-Jacques Thibaud Competition. He next studied at the Moscow Conservatory with Yakov Zak. Egorov remained at the Moscow Conservatory for six years. In 1974, Egorov won the Bronze Medal at the Tchaikovsky Competition in Moscow. In 1975, he was awarded the 3rd Prize at the Queen Elisabeth International Music Competition of Belgium.

Defection and career in the West

Egorov defected from the Soviet Union in 1976 while on a concert tour in Rome, Italy and travelled to Amsterdam where he was to meet Jan Brouwer (1947-1988), his long term partner.

In 1977 Egorov participated in the Van Cliburn Competition in Fort Worth, Texas. He became an audience favorite. When he was not chosen as a finalist, a group of patrons and Cliburn board members formed an ad-hoc committee led by Cliburn trustee Beverley Taylor Smith and American impresario Maxim Gershunoff, which raised money equal to the Van Cliburn top prize of $10,000 to further Egorov's career by funding a New York debut. The South African Steven DeGroote took the first place award that year. Gershunoff as Egorov's American manager presented his New York recital debut in Alice Tully Hall at Lincoln Center on January 23, 1978. Three months later, he appeared in Chicago, Illinois and a critic there dubbed his performance "the debut of the decade." In July, 1978, Musical America Magazine selected Youri Egorov as their "Musician of the Month". He made his Carnegie Hall debut on December 16, 1978 once again under the aegis of Gershunoff. The concert was recorded live. Writing for The New York Times, Harold C. Schonberg said Egorov played "...in a free, romantic style, and his approach is quite different from that of so many competition winners."

In August 1979, two of Egorov's albums appeared on Billboard Magazine'''s Best-Selling Classical LP chart. Throughout the 1980s Egorov played primarily in Europe. His last American appearance was in Florida in 1986.

Egorov was featured in the book Great Contemporary Pianists Speak for Themselves compiled by Elyse Mach. In it, he spoke candidly on the topics of rehearsal, pre-concert nervousness, artistic restrictions in Russia, and homosexuality. Sviatoslav Richter, Dinu Lipatti, Arturo Benedetti Michelangeli, Vladimir Horowitz and Glenn Gould are among the pianists Youri Egorov cited as having influenced him.

Death and legacy
Egorov died at his home in Amsterdam aged 33 from what was believed to be complications of AIDS. At the time of his death 14 recordings of his had been commercially issued, and several more were awaiting release. He is buried alongside Jan Brouwer at Driehuis Velsen Crematorium, Driehuis, North Holland, Netherlands.

Parallels have been drawn between the playing styles of Youri Egorov and Dinu Lipatti. Additionally, both men gave their final concert performances at the age of 33, each knowing at the time that he was afflicted with a fatal illness and had but months to live.

In 1989 Egorov was the subject of a VPRO Television documentary, "Youri Egorov 1954 - 1988"'' by Eline Flipse. The program won the special prize of the jury at the BANFF-televisiefestival in Canada and was nominated in 1990 for the Prix Italia.

Egorov's posthumously released CD, "Legacy 2: Youri Egorov", received the "Perfect Five-Star Rating" from CD Review Magazine.

Today, this pianist remains "in the memory of more than one music lover for the incredible delicacy and clarity of his playing".

Recordings

See also
 List of Eastern Bloc defectors

References 

Brokken, Jan. "Met Musici: Elf portretten" Uitgeverij De Arbeiderspers Amsterdam 1988.
Brokken, Jan. "In het huis van de dichter" Uitgeverij Atlas Amsterdam 2008.
Haan, Wim de. "Youri Egorov - The Complete Discography". Uitg. Wim de Haan, 2021.

External links

 Home of Youri Egorov, his website.
 Youri Egorov - His complete original diary Italy 1976 (Wim de Haan, paperback, May 2020)

Russian classical pianists
Male classical pianists
Moscow Conservatory alumni
Kazan Conservatory alumni
Prize-winners of the Queen Elisabeth Competition
Long-Thibaud-Crespin Competition prize-winners
Russian LGBT musicians
LGBT classical musicians
Soviet defectors
Musicians from Kazan
EMI Classics and Virgin Classics artists
AIDS-related deaths in the Netherlands
1988 deaths
1954 births
20th-century classical pianists
20th-century classical musicians
20th-century Russian musicians
20th-century Russian male musicians
20th-century Russian LGBT people